Frontpage: Ulat ni Mel Tiangco is a Philippine television news broadcasting show broadcast by GMA Network. Anchored by Mel Tiangco, it premiered on August 23, 1999, on the network's evening line up replacing GMA Network News. The show concluded on March 12, 2004. It was replaced by 24 Oras in its timeslot.

Overview
Frontpage: Ulat ni Mel Tiangco premiered on August 23, 1999, replacing the weekday edition of GMA Network News. The newscast delivered local and international news, from politics to entertainment.

Broadcasting in the GMA EDSA TV Complex studio using green screen technology, news delivery in stand-up, and runs in 45 minutes. It received numerous awards from PMPC Star Awards for TV and Catholic Mass Media Award's Best News Program Award. She was also chosen by the PMPC Star Awards for Television as their choice for Best Female Newscaster. She was also notable for philosophy works of GMA Foundation thru Bisig-Bayan. Several substitute anchors are Arnold Clavio, Daniel Razon and Rhea Santos. It introduced its new segments such as GMA Action Force by Candice Giron & Good News. Rhea Santos was chosen as the new segment host for GMA Action Force replacing Giron, Love Añover on Buenas Balita... And Everything which later became Kuwento Dito, Kuwento Doon, and TJ Manotoc on the newscast's new showbiz segment Starwatch; Santos, Añover, and Manotoc were hosts from Unang Hirit.

On July 15, 2002, the newscast was moved to its early evening timeslot.

On October 18, 2003, a special edition of the program was aired in time for the network's coverage of then-U.S. President George W. Bush's state visit in the country. The edition was anchored with Jessica Soho and Mike Enriquez.

On March 12, 2004, Frontpage aired its last broadcast to make way for the network's new early-evening newscast 24 Oras, while Mike Enriquez left Saksi for almost nine years.

Anchors
Mel Tiangco
Rhea Santos 
Candice Giron 
TJ Manotoc 
 Love Añover

References

1999 Philippine television series debuts
2004 Philippine television series endings
Filipino-language television shows
Flagship evening news shows
GMA Network news shows
GMA Integrated News and Public Affairs shows
Philippine television news shows